Hydroxypropyl distarch phosphate (HDP) is a modified resistant starch. It is currently used as a food additive (INS number 1442). It is approved for use in the European Union (listed as E1442), the United States, Australia, Taiwan, and New Zealand.

See also 
 Modified starch
 Silicon dioxide

References

External links 
 E1442: Hydroxypropyl di-starch phosphate, food-info.net

Starch
Edible thickening agents
E-number additives
Phosphate esters